Ophthalmoconalia strandi is a beetle in the genus Ophthalmoconalia of the family Mordellidae. It was described in 1994 by Horák.

References

Mordellidae
Beetles described in 1994